The Mid-States Football Association (MSFA) is a college athletic conference affiliated with the NAIA.  Member institutions are located in Illinois, Indiana, Iowa, Michigan, and Missouri.  The MSFA was organized in 1993, and on-field competition began in 1994. The MSFA is divided into two leagues, the Mideast and the Midwest.

MSFA member schools have won eight NAIA National Championships since the inception of the league in 1993.  An MSFA team has played in each of the last seven championships, winning six of the seven, including each of the last three.  The two MSFA division champions earn an automatic bid to the NAIA National Championship Series.

History

Chronological timeline
 1994 - The Mid-States Football Association (MSFA) was founded. Charter members included the following: Geneva College, Malone College (now Malone University), Tiffin University, Urbana University, and Westminster College representing the Mideast League, while the University of Findlay, Lindenwood College (now Lindenwood University), Olivet Nazarene University, Saint Xavier University, Taylor University and Trinity International University representing the Midwest League beginning the 1994 fall season (1994-95 academic year).
 1996 - Lindenwood left the MSFA to move its football program with its other sports when it joined the Heart of America Athletic Conference (HAAC) after the 1995 fall season (1995-96 academic year).
 1996 - Tri-State University (now Trine University) and Walsh University joined the MSFA to represent the Mideast League, while Iowa Wesleyan College (now Iowa Wesleyan University) and St. Ambrose University joined the MSFA to represent the Midwest League in the 1996 fall season (1996-97 academic year).
 1998 - Findlay and Westminster (Pa.) left the MSFA to move their football programs to the Midwest Intercollegiate Football Conference (MIFC), along with their other sports when both joined the Division II ranks of the National Collegiate Athletic Association (NCAA) and the Great Lakes Intercollegiate Athletic Conference (GLIAC) after the 1997 fall season (1997-98 academic year).
 1998 - The University of Saint Francis of Indiana joined the MSFA to represent the Mideast League, while McKendree College (now McKendree University) joined the MSFA to represent the Midwest League in the 1998 fall season (1998-99 academic year).
 1999 - St. Ambrose left the MSFA after the 1998 fall season (1998-99 academic year).
 1999 - The University of St. Francis of Illinois joined the MSFA to represent the Mideast League in the 1999 fall season (1999-2000 academic year).
 2000 - St. Ambrose returned to the MSFA in the 2000 fall season (2000-01 academic year).
 2002 - Tiffin left the MSFA to join the Independent Football Alliance (IFA) after the 2001 fall season (2001-02 academic year).
 2002 - William Penn University joined the MSFA to represent the Midwest League in the 2002 fall season (2002-03 academic year).
 2003 - Trine left the MSFA to move its football program with its other sports when it joined the NCAA Division III ranks after the 2002 fall season (2002-03 academic year).
 2003 - Quincy University joined the MSFA to represent the Mideast League in the 2003 fall season (2003-04 academic year).
 2004 - Ohio Dominican University joined the MSFA to represent the Mideast League in the 2004 fall season (2004-05 academic year).
 2006 - Quincy moved to the Midwest League in the 2006 fall season (2006-07 academic year).
 2007 - Geneva left the MSFA to move its football program with its other sports when it joined the NCAA Division III ranks and the Presidents' Athletic Conference (PAC) after the 2006 fall season (2006-07 academic year).
 2007 - Marian University joined the MSFA to represent the Mideast League in the 2007 fall season (2007-08 academic year).
 2007 - Saint Xavier (Ill.) moved to the Mideast League in the 2007 fall season (2007-08 academic year).
 2008 - Urbana left the MSFA to move its football program with its other sports when it joined the NCAA Division III ranks and the Presidents' Athletic Conference (PAC) after the 2007 fall season (2007-08 academic year).
 2009 - Ohio Dominican left the MSFA to move its football program with its other sports when it joined the NCAA Division II ranks after the 2008 fall season (2008-09 academic year).
 2009 - Grand View University and Waldorf University joined the MSFA to represent the Midwest League in the 2009 fall season (2009-10 academic year).
 2009 - Olivet Nazarene and Trinity International moved to the Mideast League in the 2009 fall season (2009-10 academic year).
 2011 - Three institutions left the MSFA to move their football programs with their other sports when they joined the NCAA Division II ranks: Malone and Walsh to the GLIAC, and McKendree to the Great Lakes Valley Conference (GLVC) after the 2010 fall season (2010-11 academic year).
 2011 - Concordia University Ann Arbor joined the MSFA to represent in the Mideast League in the 2011 fall season (2011-12 academic year).
 2011 - Quincy returned to the Mideast League, while Olivet Nazarene and Trinity International went back to the Midwest League in the 2011 fall season (2011-12 academic year).
 2012 - Two institutions left the MSFA to move their football programs with their other sports when they joined the NCAA ranks: Quincy to D-II and the GLVC, and Iowa Wesleyan to D-III after the 2011 fall season (2011-12 academic year).
 2012 - Siena Heights University joined the MSFA to represent in the Mideast League in the 2012 fall season (2012-13 academic year).
 2013 - Robert Morris University Illinois joined the MSFA to represent in the Mideast League in the 2013 fall season (2013-14 academic year).
 2013 - Saint Xavier (Ill.) returned to the Mideast League, while Saint Francis (Ill.) moved to the Midwest League in the 2013 fall season (2013-14 academic year).
 2014 - Waldorf left the MSFA to join the North Star Athletic Association (NSAA) as an affiliate member for football after the 2013 fall season (2013-14 academic year).
 2015 - Grand View and William Penn left the MSFA to move their football programs with their other sports when both joined the HAAC after the 2014 fall season (2014-15 academic year).
 2015 - Lindenwood University – Belleville and Missouri Baptist University joined the MSFA to represent the Mideast League in the 2015 fall season (2015-16 academic year).
 2015 - Saint Francis (Ill.) went back to the Mideast League in the 2015 fall season (2015-16 academic year).
 2018 - Lindenwood–Belleville left the MSFA after the 2017 fall season (2017-18 academic year).
 2019 - Robert Morris (Ill.) left the MSFA after the 2018 fall season (2018-19 academic year).
 2019 - Indiana Wesleyan University and Lawrence Technological University joined the MSFA to represent the Mideast League in the 2019 fall season (2019-20 academic year).
 2019 - Missouri Baptist moved to the Midwest League in the 2019 fall season (2019-20 academic year).
 2020 - Madonna University joined the MSFA to represent the Mideast League, while Roosevelt University joined the MSFA to represent the Midwest League in the 2020 fall season (2020-21 academic year).
 2021 - Judson University joined the MSFA to represent the Midwest League in the 2021 fall season (2021-22 academic year).
 2022 - Two institutions announced that they will leave the MSFA to move their football programs with their other sports: Roosevelt to D-II and the GLIAC, and Missouri Baptist to the HAAC after the 2022 fall season (2022-23 academic year).
 2023 – Trinity International University will leave the MSFA, coinciding with the closure of its residential campus at the end of the spring semester in favor of online undergraudate programs.

National Championship appearances

Member schools

Current members
The MSFA currently has 16 member schools, all of them are private schools. In 2021, Madonna began conference play as a member of the Mideast League, and Judson has competed in the Midwest.

Notes

Former members

Notes

Membership timeline

Sports
The MSFA sponsors teams only in football. For other sports, MSFA-member schools are affiliated with a variety of other conferences; including the American Midwest Conference, the Chicagoland Collegiate Athletic Conference, the Crossroads League, and the Wolverine–Hoosier Athletic Conference.

References

External links
 

 
Sports in the Midwestern United States
Sports organizations established in 1993
1993 establishments in the United States
Articles which contain graphical timelines